Schuitema may refer to:

 Frits Schuitema (born 1944), Dutch former chairman of Philips
 Paul Schuitema (1897-1973), Dutch graphic artist